Madagascar competed at the 1992 Summer Olympics in Barcelona, Spain.
The nation returned to the Olympic Games after missing the 1988 Summer Olympics.

Competitors
The following is the list of number of competitors in the Games.

Results by event

Athletics
Men's 400m Hurdles
Hubert Rakotombelontsoa
 Heat — 51.54 (→ did not advance)

Men's Marathon
 Alain Klerk Razahasoa — 2:41.41 (→ 81st place)

Men's Triple Jump
Toussaint Rabenala 
 Qualification — 16.84 m (→ did not advance)

Boxing
Men's Light Flyweight (– 48 kg)
 Anicet Rasoanaivo
 First Round — Lost to O Song-chol (PRK), KO-2

Men's Featherweight (– 57 kg)
 Heritovo Rakotomanga

Swimming
Women's 50m Freestyle
 Vola Hanta Ratsifa Andrihamanana
 Heat – 28.22 (→ did not advance, 43rd place)

Women's 100m Breaststroke
 Vola Hanta Ratsifa Andrihamanana
 Heat – 1:17.77 (→ did not advance, 38th place)

Tennis
Women's Singles Competition
 Dally Randriantefy
 First Round – Lost to Patricia Hy-Boulais (Canada) 2–6, 1–6
 Natacha Randriantefy
 First Round – Lost to Helena Suková (Czechoslovakia) 0–6, 1–6

Women's Doubles Competition
 Natacha Randriantefy and Dally Randriantefy 
 First round — Lost to Conchita Martínez and Arantxa Sánchez Vicario (Spain) 0–6, 0–6

References

Sources
Official Olympic Reports

Nations at the 1992 Summer Olympics
1992
Olympics